Scaphyglottis fusiformis is a species of orchid found from Costa Rica to tropical South America.

References

External links

fusiformis
Orchids of Costa Rica